Măgurele is a commune in Prahova County, Muntenia, Romania. It is composed of three villages: Coada Malului, Iazu and Măgurele.

References

Communes in Prahova County
Localities in Muntenia